Teenage Millionaire is a 1961 American comedy film directed by Lawrence Doheny and written by Lawrence Doheny and Harry Spalding. The film stars Jimmy Clanton, Rocky Graziano, ZaSu Pitts, Diane Jergens, Valerie Ziegler, Cheyenne Boyer, Gabriella Taliani, Gloria Prosser Maurice Gosfield and Eileen O'Neill. The film was released on August 17, 1961, by United Artists.

Plot

Bobby Schultz goes to live with his Aunt Theodora and her butler-bodyguard Rocky following the sudden deaths of his parents. At a radio station she owns, Bobby takes a job and meets a girl, Bambi, who circulates a new record on which Bobby is a vocalist.

As the song catches on and Bobby's reputation grows, Theodora decides it is not to the boy's benefit and decides to sell the radio station. Bobby is then drafted into the Army, saying goodbye to all at a farewell party in his honor.

Cast 
Jimmy Clanton as Bobby Schultz 
Rocky Graziano as Rocky 
ZaSu Pitts as Aunt Theodora
Diane Jergens as Barbara 'Bambi' Price
Joan Tabor as Adrienne
Sid Gould as Sheldon Vale
Maurice Gosfield as Ernie
Eileen O'Neil as Desidieria
Jackie Wilson as himself
Chubby Checker as himself
Dion DiMucci as himself
Bill Black's Combo as themselves
Marv Johnson as himself
Vicki Spencer as herself	
Jack Larson as himself

References

External links 
 

1961 films
1961 comedy films
1960s teen comedy films
American rock music films
American teen comedy films
United Artists films
1960s English-language films
1960s American films